Barlow is a village and civil parish in the North East Derbyshire district of Derbyshire, England.  According to the 2001 census the parish had a population of 884, increasing to 920 at the 2011 Census.  The village is about 4 miles north-west of Chesterfield.

Culture
The village holds an annual well dressing (on the second Wednesday after the first Sunday in August) and a carnival (on the following Saturday).

Notable buildings

Barlow's church is dedicated to St Lawrence. Barlow Woodseats Hall, on the edge of the village, is the only manor house in the parish and dates from the 17th century. Amongst the other historical buildings is Lee, or Lea, Bridge, which is a grade II listed early 18th-century packhorse bridge; it has been described as "a substantially complete example of rural bridge 'engineering'".

Notable residents
 William Owtram was born here in 1626.
 Bernie Clifton currently lives here.

See also
Listed buildings in Barlow, Derbyshire
Barlow Common
List of places in Derbyshire

References

External links

Villages in Derbyshire
Towns and villages of the Peak District
Civil parishes in Derbyshire
North East Derbyshire District